The Most Lamentable Tragedy is the fourth studio album by New Jersey punk rock band Titus Andronicus, released on July 28, 2015, through Merge Records. It is a rock opera in five acts that follows "Our Hero," a man who is visited by his doppelganger and goes through considerable life experiences and dream sequences, all acting as a metaphor for manic depression.

Reception

At Metacritic, which assigns a normalized rating out of 100 to reviews from music critics, TMLT has received an average score of 79, indicating "generally favorable reviews." Tiny Mix Tapes gave it a perfect 10/10, saying "TMLT feels like the Titus Andronicus record par excellence, it pushes and shoves at the boundaries of what such a record could or should conceivably sound like," while Pitchfork Media noted, "A 29-track, 93-minute rock opera that immediately restored their claims to outsized ambition, as only a 29-track, 93-minute rock opera might."

Accolades

Track listing

Charts

Personnel

Titus Andronicus
 Eric Harm - Drums, Vocals
 Jonah Maurer - Guitar
 Adam Reich - Lead Guitar, Vocals, Percussion, Organ, Mandolin, Glockenspiel
 Patrick Stickles - Lead Vocals, Guitar, Electronics, Chord organ, Harmonica, Glockenspiel
 Julian Veronesi - Bass Guitar, Vocals

Additional musicians
 Yoni David - Percussion
 Elio DeLuca - Piano, Organ, Electric Piano
 Owen Pallett - Violin, Viola
 Ryan Weisheit - Flute, Clarinet, Bass Clarinet, Tenor Saxophone
 Alex Levine, Carrie-Anne Murphy, Catherine Herrick, Matthew Miller, R.J. Gordon, Ryan Levine - Vocals

References

2015 albums
Titus Andronicus (band) albums
Merge Records albums
Concept albums
Rock operas